Guruli is a Georgian surname. Notable people with the surname include:

 Alexander Guruli (born 1985), Georgian footballer
 Gija Guruli (born 1964), Georgian footballer

Georgian-language surnames